Christoph Göbel (born 23 March 1989) is a German footballer who plays as a defender for Wacker Nordhausen.

Club career

Rot-Weiss Erfurt
Göbel progressed through the Rot-Weiss Erfurt youth system. He made several appearances with the reserve side, but failed to make a first team appearance during his tenure there.

Sportfreunde Siegen
In July 2010, Göbel moved to Sportfreunde Siegen, arriving alongside Jörn Nowak. He made his league debut for the club on 27 August 2010 in a 3-0 victory over MSV Duisburg II. In May 2011, Göbel signed a one-year contract extension with the club.

FSV Zwickau
In July 2012, Göbel joined Regionalliga club FSV Zwickau on a free transfer. He made his league debut for the club on 3 October 2012 in a 0-0 home draw with Carl Zeiss Jena. He scored his first league goal for the club just four days later in a 3-0 home victory over Germania Halberstadt. His goal, scored in the 47th minute, made the score 2-0 to Zwickau. In May 2014, Göbel signed a two-year contract extension with the club. At the end of the 2017-18 season, Göbel's contract ran out and he left on a free transfer.

Wacker Nordhausen
On 6 June 2018, Göbel moved to Regionalliga side Wacker Nordhausen. He made his league debut for the club on 27 July 2018 in a 1-1 home draw with Hertha BSC II.

Personal life
Christoph's brother, Patrick, is also a professional footballer, who plays for Würzburger Kickers.

References

External links
 Christoph Göbel on worldfootball.com
 

German footballers
Association football defenders
FSV Zwickau players
3. Liga players
People from Heilbad Heiligenstadt
1989 births
Living people
Footballers from Thuringia